Trouble Brewing is a 1939 British comedy film directed by Anthony Kimmins and starring George Formby, Googie Withers and Gus McNaughton. It was made by Associated Talking Pictures, and includes the songs "Fanlight Fanny" and "Hitting the Highspots Now". The film is based on a novel by Joan Butler, and the sets were designed by art director Wilfred Shingleton.

Plot summary
George Formby plays George Gullip, a Daily Sun compositor who wins a large sum at the racing. He collects three ten-pound notes. Unable to spend them at the bar, he exchanges them for six fivers. He is paid with counterfeit notes. Gullip then tries to find the criminals. In so doing he goes "undercover" as a waiter and a wrestler. Clues suggest the villain is Gullip's own boss.

Cast

Critical reception
TV Guide found the film an "enjoyable Formby vehicle". Sky Movies wrote, "the fun is as fast and furious in this incident-packed George Formby romp as in any film he made...Receipts foamed over at box-offices throughout Britain."

References

Bibliography
 Low, Rachael. Filmmaking in 1930s Britain. George Allen & Unwin, 1985.
 Perry, George. Forever Ealing. Pavilion Books, 1994.
 Wood, Linda. British Films, 1927-1939. British Film Institute, 1986.

External links
 
 
 

1939 films
1939 musical comedy films
1939 romantic comedy films
1930s sports comedy films
British black-and-white films
British romantic comedy films
British sports comedy films
British musical comedy films
Films directed by Anthony Kimmins
Associated Talking Pictures
British romantic musical films
Films set in England
1930s romantic musical films
1930s English-language films
1930s British films